Lashmeet is a census-designated place (CDP) in western Mercer County, West Virginia, United States.  It lies along West Virginia Route 10 northwest of the city of Princeton, the county seat of Mercer County.  Its elevation is 2,539 feet (774 m).  Although Lashmeet is unincorporated, it has a post office, with the ZIP code of 24733. As of the 2010 census, its population was 479.

The community most likely derives its name from the local Lashmeet (or Lashmutt) family.

References

Census-designated places in Mercer County, West Virginia
Census-designated places in West Virginia